Hemitripterus americanus, the sea raven, is a species of marine ray-finned fish belonging to the subfamily Hemitripterinae of the family Agonidae. The sea raven is found along the Atlantic coast of North America.

Taxonomy
Hemitripterus americanus was first formally described as Scorpaena americana in 1789 by the German naturalist Johann Friedrich Gmelin with its type locality given as "America". In 1801 Marcus Elieser Bloch and Johann Gottlob Theaenus Schneider described a new species Cottus tripterygius and in 1829 Georges Cuvier proposed the new monotypic genus Hemitripterus for C. tripterygius which was later shown to be a junior synonym of Gmelin's S. americana. The genus Hemitripterus is classified within the subfamily Hemtripterinae of the family Agonidae.

Description 
Hemitripterus americanus are variable in color from blood red to reddish purple to yellow brown. The ventral surface is typically yellow. The have large heads and a robust, tapering body. There are obvious fleshy folds on the head and lower jaw. There is also an unusual ragged layer of skin on the first dorsal fin. They have large, fan-shaped pectoral fins and a small caudal fin. They have a broad moutrh which is lined with several rows of teeth.

Distribution and habitat 
Hemitripterus americanus is found along the Atlantic Coast of North America, from Labrador in Canada to Chesapeake Bay. They are demersal fish found over rocky or hard substrates but can be found anywhere in the water column.

Biology
Hemitripterus americanus is considered to be a voracious predator which preys on a wide variety of animals including benthic invertebrates and fish such as herring, sand eels and silver hake. When they are removed from the water they inflate and if returned to it they cannot submerge. Spawning adults attach their eggs to the bases of sponges.

References 

americanus
Fish described in 1789
Taxa named by Johann Friedrich Gmelin